Mitzura Domnica Arghezi (10 December 1924 – 27 October 2015) was a Romanian actress and politician. 

She was born Domnica Theodorescu in Bucharest to writer Tudor Arghezi and his wife Paraschiva. Arghezi served in the Chamber of Deputies from 1996 to 2004. She was a Romanian Radio Society board member from 2005 to 2010. 

She died on 27 October 2015, aged 90.

Selected filmography
 Doi vecini (1959) – Marița
 Furtuna (1960)
 Celebrul 702 (1962)
 Titanic Waltz (1964) – Gena
 Michael the Brave (1971)
 Șantaj (1981)
 Secretul lui Nemesis (1987) – The Neighbour
 Iubire și onoare (2010) – Varvara

References

External links

1924 births
2015 deaths
Actresses from Bucharest
Members of the Chamber of Deputies (Romania)
Romanian actor-politicians
20th-century Romanian actresses
20th-century Romanian politicians
20th-century Romanian women politicians
21st-century Romanian politicians
21st-century Romanian women politicians